The following lists events that happened during 1922 in Australia.

Incumbents

Monarch – George V
Governor-General – Henry Forster, 1st Baron Forster of Lepe
Prime Minister – Billy Hughes
Chief Justice – Adrian Knox

State premiers
Premier of New South Wales – James Dooley (until 13 April), then George Fuller
Premier of Queensland – Ted Theodore
Premier of South Australia – Henry Barwell
Premier of Tasmania – Walter Lee (until 12 August), then John Hayes
Premier of Western Australia – James Mitchell
Premier of Victoria – Harry Lawson

State governors
Governor of New South Wales – Sir Walter Davidson
Governor of Queensland – Sir Matthew Nathan
Governor of South Australia – Sir William Weigall (until 24 April), then Sir Tom Bridges (from 4 December)
Governor of Tasmania – Sir William Allardyce
Governor of Victoria – George Rous, 3rd Earl of Stradbroke
Governor of Western Australia – Sir Francis Newdegate

Events
14 February – Women are allowed to stand for parliament in Tasmania.
22 March – The Queensland Legislative Council, the upper house of the Parliament of Queensland is abolished.
10 June – A general election is held in Tasmania, which results in a hung parliament.
3 July – Queensland abolishes capital punishment, the first state in Australia to do so.
12 August – The Country Party and the Nationalist Party form a coalition government in Tasmania, with John Hayes as Premier.

Science and technology
21 September – A total solar eclipse occurs over Australia, allowing scientists to test Albert Einstein's general theory of relativity.

Arts and literature

4 May – British author D. H. Lawrence arrives in Australia for a three-month holiday, where he will meet Mollie Skinner and write the novel Kangaroo.

Sport
28 February – Victoria wins the Sheffield Shield.
30 September – Fitzroy wins the 1922 VFL Grand Final, defeating Collingwood 11.13 (79) to 9.14 (68).
7 November – King Ingoda wins the Melbourne Cup.
The 1922 NSWRFL Premiership is won by North Sydney, who defeated Glebe 35–3 in the final.

Births
5 January – Anthony Synnot, Chief of the Defence Force (died 2001)
15 January – Eric Willis, Premier of New South Wales (died 1999)
23 January – Tom Lewis, Premier of New South Wales (died 2016)
21 February – Fos Williams, Australian rules footballer (died 2001)
24 February – Bill Morris, Australian rules footballer (died 1960)
14 March – Bob Bignall, soccer player (died 2013)
15 March – Hesba Fay Brinsmead, children's author (died 2003)
28 March – Neville Bonner, first Indigenous federal MP (died 1999)
29 March – Mac Holten, Australian rules footballer and politician (died 1996)
30 March – John McLeay, Jr., politician (died 2000)
10 April – Nancy Millis, microbiologist (died 2012)
9 May – Col Hoy, cricket umpire (died 1999)
12 May – Arthur Gorrie, Hobby shop proprietor (died 1992)
27 June – Milton Clark, Australian rules footballer (died 2018)
7 July – Robert Raymond, filmmaker and television pioneer (died 2003)
29 July – Mac Wilson, Australian rules footballer (died 1996)
1 August – Pat McDonald, actress (Number 96) (died 1990)
23 August – Ronald Wilson, High Court justice (died 2005)
30 August – Lionel Murphy, Attorney-General and High Court justice (died 1986)
25 September – Ted Baldwin, politician (died 2008)
26 September – Leonard Teale, actor (died 1994)
7 October – Jim McCabe, Victorian politician (died 2019)
 10 October – Tim McNamara, musician (died 1983)
1 November – James Rowland, Chief of Air Force and Governor of New South Wales (died 1999)
18 November – Una Hale, operatic soprano (died 2005)
4 December – Densey Clyne, naturalist, photographer and writer (died 2019)
6 December – Gordon Ada, microbiologist (died 2012)
20 December – Geoff Mack, country music singer (died 2017)
28 December – Lionel Bowen, politician (died 2012)

Deaths

 10 January – Frank Tudor, 6th Federal Leader of the Opposition (b. 1866)
 14 February – Bertram Stevens, art and literary critic (b. 1872)
 8 March – Elizabeth, Lady Hope, evangelist (b. 1842)
 22 March – Arthur Groom, Victorian politician and land agent (b. 1852)
 4 April – Peter Waite, pastoralist, businessman and philanthropist (born in the United Kingdom) (b. 1834)
 7 April – James McGowen, 18th Premier of New South Wales (born in the Indian Ocean) (b. 1855)
 14 April – Rose Summerfield, feminist and labour activist (died in Paraguay) (b. 1864)
 24 April – Colin Campbell Ross, wine bar owner and falsely convicted murderer (b. 1892)
 30 April – Robert Carl Sticht, metallurgist and art collector (born in the United States) (b. 1856)
 24 May – James Arthur Pollock, physicist (born in Ireland) (b. 1865)
 25 May – Roy Redgrave, actor (born in the United Kingdom) (b. 1873)
 31 May – Jørgen Jensen, soldier (born in Denmark) (b. 1891)
 15 June – Alfred Cecil Rowlandson, publisher and bookseller (died in New Zealand) (b. 1865)
 17 June – Sir Robert Philp, 15th Premier of Queensland (born in the United Kingdom) (d. 1922)
 11 July – Hans Irvine, Victorian politician and winemaker (died in the United Kingdom) (b. 1856)
 23 July – Joseph Edmund Carne, geologist (b. 1855)
 2 September – Henry Lawson, writer and poet (b. 1867)
 17 September  – Kate Rickards, trapeze artist and musical theatre actress (died in the Red Sea) (b. 1862) 
 26 September – Sir Charles Wade, 17th Premier of New South Wales (b. 1863)
 4 October – Ellis Rowan, naturalist and illustrator (b. 1848)
 27 November – Dugald Thomson, New South Wales politician (born in the United Kingdom) (b. 1849)
 17 December – David Lindsay, explorer and surveyor (b. 1856)

See also
 List of Australian films of the 1920s

References

 
Australia
Years of the 20th century in Australia